The NIFL Premier Intermediate League is the third division of the Northern Ireland Football League, the national association football league in Northern Ireland, and the highest intermediate division in Northern Ireland, occupying level three in the Northern Ireland football league system – below the NIFL Premiership (level 1) and NIFL Championship (level 2).

2016 restructuring
Under reforms agreed by the NIFL clubs in 2014, from 2016, when the previous Championship 1 acquired senior status, Championship 2 continued as the Premier Intermediate League, retaining its intermediate status and thus became the top intermediate league in Northern Ireland.

Current members

The Premier Intermediate League consists of 12 teams.

Stadia and locations

See also 
NIFL Premiership
NIFL Championship
IFA Interim Intermediate League
Irish Intermediate League
IFA Reserve League
IFA Intermediate Cup
George Wilson Cup
Irish Cup
Irish League Cup
County Antrim Shield
Steel & Sons Cup
Mid-Ulster Cup
Bob Radcliffe Cup
North West Senior Cup
Craig Memorial Cup
Northern Ireland football league system

References

General
Malcolm Brodie (ed.), Northern Ireland Soccer Yearbook (various editions)

3
Northern Ireland
Sports leagues established in 2016
2016 establishments in Northern Ireland